The 2021–2023 Bulgarian political crisis is an unresolved period of instability in Bulgaria, which has seen the country face five elections over two years: April 2021, July 2021, November 2021, October 2022 and April 2023.

The first two elections failed to result in a governing coalition, but the November 2021 election saw Kiril Petkov create an unstable government which lasted only 7 months. The October 2022 snap election resulted in another gridlock, leading to the upcoming 2023 election in April.

Background 

Former Prime Minister Boyko Borisov, and his populist conservative party GERB, had led Bulgaria consecutively since 2016. Borisov's third government was embroiled in numerous corruption scandals during its time in office, specifically surrounding the allocation of EU funds, infrastructure projects and government subsidies.

Scandals including alleged photographs of the former Prime Minister lying on a bed next to a handgun, bars of gold and stacks of money and the "Eight Dwarfs" extortion scandal culminated in protests on 9 July 2020, with the aim of removing Borisov's government and Chief Prosecutor Ivan Geshev.

These protests would continue daily until after the government's term concluded on 16 April 2021.

The protests saw the rise to prominence of several so called "parties of change", consisting mainly of new political parties which opposed Borisov, and many of whom joined in with the protests. The main three electoral coalitions or parties in this bloc were There Is Such a People (ITN), Democratic Bulgaria (DB) and Stand Up! Mafia, Get Out! (IMSV), and polls suggested this bloc garnered large support.

2021 elections

April 2021 election 

The election took place on 4 April 2021, and was scheduled as a regular election following four years since the 2017 election. 

Borisov's governing coalition lost its majority, with the government-supporting parties falling from a combined 134 seats to 75 out of 240, with only GERB staying in the National Assembly. In contrast, all three of the "parties of change" groupings entered the national assembly, winning a total of 92 seats, with 51 of these coming from Slavi Trifonov's ITN. The Socialist Party (BSPzB) also suffered its worst result in a democratic election. The election also saw turnout drop 3.5pp to 49.1%.

The "Anti-Corruption" bloc ruled out working with Borisov and GERB, and as such it was unlikely any government would be formed. President Rumen Radev gave first mandate was given to GERB as the largest party, who failed to form a government with the former foreign minister, Daniel Mitov, as the nominated Prime Ministerial candidate. The second mandate was offered to ITN, who refused after GERB had suggested it would be willing to support an ITN-led government. Radev gave the final mandate to Korneliya Ninova of the BSPzB, who refused to form a government after the "parties of change" refused to work with them.
Stefan Yanev was appointed by Radev to lead an interim government, and a snap election was called for 11 July.

July 2021 election 

The July election saw ITN continue on its upward momentum, topping the polls in the election with 65 seats. The "parties of change" rose to 112 seats, still shy of the 121 needed for a majority. GERB fell to 63 seats, and BSPzB continued its downward trend. Turnout dropped by 8.7pp to 40.4%.

When ITN was handed the mandate by Radev, they opted to form a minority government with the support of the other anti-corruption parties and BSPzB, but the negotiations fell through. GERB ruled out trying to form a government, and BSPzB failed to convince other parties to support the caretaker government for a full 4 year term. Another election was scheduled for 14 November, occurring at the same time as the presidential election. Yanev continued as caretaker Prime Minister.

November 2021 election 

After ITN were perceived to have failed to work constructively with other parties to form a government, their support drastically dropped, coming in fourth place behind GERB, DB and BSPzB in some polls.

In August, there was speculation that two popular cabinet ministers from Yanev's first caretaker government, Kiril Petkov and Asen Vasilev could form a new anti-corruption party, and the project was officially launched on 17 September. We Continue the Change (PP) hoped to be a uniting force, which could bring together a government following the elections.

At the election, PP came out on top with 67 seats. The "parties of change" fell to 108 seats, with IBG-NI (formerly ISMV), falling out of the National Assembly. GERB and BSPzB continued to fall in their seat count. Revival (VAZ), a far-right party, also entered the Assembly following protests against the interim government's introduction of a vaccine passport, or "green pass". Turnout fell by a further 2pp to 38.4%.

Following the election, Petkov said he would be willing to work with any party which wished to join the fight against corruption in Bulgaria. The Turkish minority interest party Movement for Rights and Freedoms (DPS) and GERB refused to cooperate with PP. On 10 December, the leaders of PP, BSP, ITN and DB announced they had agreed to form a coalition. Radev, who was re-elected as President, gave PP the first mandate.

With the first mandate, PP proposed a government. This was approved by the National Assembly on 13 December.

Petkov government 

One of the first challenges of the new government was the Russian invasion of Ukraine. In February, defense minister Yanev was dismissed after he denied to call the invasion war, instead using the term "special military operation" as was used by Russia. BSP also threatened to leave the government if Bulgaria sent military aid to Ukraine. Despite this, according to investigations by Welt, Bulgaria used intermediaries to provide Kyiv with supplies of weapons, ammunition and diesel. Bulgaria was also at the forefront of urging that the EU impose sanctions on Russia as soon as possible. However, as a result of this action, the Russian-state affiliated Gazprom severed gas exports to the country. 

After a dispute about the lifting the veto against North Macedonia to allow them to join the European Union,  ITN withdrew from the government on 8 June 2022 making it a minority government. However, 6 of ITN's delegates left the party in order to support Petkov's government.

Removal 

On 22 June 2022 a motion of no-confidence succeeded with 123 members of parliament voting against the government. As no party was able to form another government within the current Parliament, President Radev scheduled another election to take place in October 2022 and appointed another interim government, led by Galab Donev, who had been minister for Labour and Social Policy in all of the interim governments, appointed by Radev (Gerdzhikov, Yanev 1 and Yanev 2).

2022 and 2023 elections

October 2022 election 

The parties which formed the previous coalition: PP, BSPzB and DB failed to gain a majority only reaching 98 of the seats. Meanwhile the two pro-Russian and nationalist parties VAZ and the new formed Bulgarian Rise (led by former interim prime minister Yanev) both made gains. GERB became largest party with around 25% and 67 seats. ITN failed to reach the 4% threshold.

It took three days for the Assembly to vote on a chairperson following the election. In the mean time, a dog called "Johnny" received joking endorsements from the public to become the chairman instead. Eventually, Vezhdi Rashidov from GERB was approved as a compromise on 21 October.

The first mandate went to GERB, and they proposed Nikolay Gabrovski. Gabrovski was disapproved by parliament on December 14.

During the government formation a debate about the return of paper ballots broke out which was abolished due to concerns of vote buying. GERB, DPS and BSP supported the return and were able to override a veto of president Radev against the changes of the electoral code.

The second mandate went to the second largest party PP on 3 January 2023. The third and last mandate was given to BSP which was also unable to form a government thus triggering snap elections, scheduled for 2 April 2023. However, BSP opened up to a potential cooperation with GERB, which has the potential for a breakthrough. Galab Donev was selected by Radev to lead another interim government.

April 2023 election 

The election scheduled for 2 April will mark the 5th election the country has faced in 2 years. It has been suggested that the political turmoil could potentially impact Bulgaria joining the Eurozone.

PP negotiated with DB, alongside other minor organisations, to run on a joint list together for the 2023 election, a proposal all constituent parties of DB supported. They hope to prioritise justice reform, joining the Schengen Area and the Eurozone. The two parties were already working together in the upcoming local elections. On 10 February, DB announced they had come to an agreement and would be running on a joint list, PP–DB.

See also  
 2018–2022 Israeli political crisis

References 

2021 in Bulgaria
2022 in Bulgaria
2023 in Bulgaria
Bulgarian political crisis
Bulgarian political crisis
Political corruption